The Lutheran Diocese of Katowice is one of the six dioceses that constitute the Polish Lutheran Church.

Location 
Located in southern Poland, its territory of the Lutheran Diocese of Katowice includes Silesia, Opole, Lesser Poland, and  Polish Subcarpathia.

List of Bishops 
Robert Fiszkal : 1946~1950
Alfred Hauptman : 1950~1981
Rudolf Pastucha : 1981~2002
Tadeusz Szurman : 2002~2014
Marian Niemiec : 2014~

External links 
Information of Lutheran Diocese Katowice (pol.)

Evangelical Church of the Augsburg Confession in Poland
Lutheran dioceses in Poland
Organisations based in Katowice
1946 establishments in Poland